Karuppusamy Kuththagaithaarar is a 2007 Indian Tamil-language masala film written and directed by A. Govindamoorthy. the song lyrics are penned by Yugabharathi and Vijay Sagar. It stars Karan, Meenakshi and Vadivelu. The film earned mixed reviews and had an average run at the box office.

Plot
Karuppusamy (Karan), is a happy go lucky guy in Madurai who is a small time contractor for a cycle stand. He also takes part in stage shows with his friends during temple festivals. Raasathi (Meenakshi), is a first year medical college student who meets Karuppusamy frequently while parking her cycle in the stand managed by Karuppusamy. Raasathi is very fond of her mother, who died when she was young. Raasathi gets attracted towards Karuppusamy as his acts reminds her of her late mother. Raasathi proposes Karuppusamy and requests him to be with her, so that she feels that her mother lives with her in the form of Karuppusamy. Karuppusamy, although reluctant at initial stages, agrees to Raasathi.

Parallel narration is the comedy track of Padithurai Pandi (Vadivelu).

Meanwhile, there is Sakthi Kumar who frequently follows Raasathi, but she gets furious seeing him. Raasathi’s father finds out about her love for Karuppusamy and gets furious. Now, all her family members are united after a long gap citing this love issue. It is revealed that Sakthi Kumar is Raasathi’s cousin brother. A small flashback is shown where, Raasathi’s uncles were ruthless money lenders in Madurai. As they were very strict in money lending, they had a huge list of enemies as well. One of such enemies wanted to take revenge on Raasathi’s family and in the event, Raasathi’s mother gets accidentally killed. This makes Raasathi’s father abandon his family and moves alone with Raasathi.

Coming to present, Raasathi’s family members are now united and they oppose her love for Karuppusamy. Karuppusamy meets Raasathi’s father and tries to convince him, but in vain. Raasathi’s family members lock her up in a room and decides to stop her education. Karuppusamy gets furious and requests them to send her to college, as he wanted her to continue her passion of becoming a doctor. Raasathi’s family members agree to send her to college but with a condition that Karuppusamy should never meet her. Karuppusamy agrees and Raasathi resumes her education now.

But secretly, Raasathi’s family members plan for her wedding and her wedding is arranged without her knowledge itself. When Karuppusamy finds out this, he gets angry and goes to Raasathi’s house. He bashes all the goons and takes Raasathi with him. Karuppusamy scolds Raasathi’s family members for not keeping up their words. Karuppusamy also promises that he will support Raasathi’s education and help her fulfill her dream. Raasathi goes with Karuppusamy.

Cast

Karan as Karuppusamy
Meenakshi as Raasathi
Venba as Young Raasathi
Vadivelu as 'Padithurai' Paandi
Shankar
King Kong
Halwa Vasu
Chaams
Vijai Kaartik
"Kalakka Povadhu Yaaru" Venkatesh as Ezharai
Sakthi Kumar as Raasathi's brother
 Bava Lakshmanan
 Karnaa Radha
Sumathi as Lady robber

Soundtrack
The soundtrack was composed by Dhina.

References

2007 films
Films shot in Madurai
2000s Tamil-language films
2000s masala films
Films directed by A. Govindamoorthy